Aleksandr Valeryevich Sereda or Oleksandr Valeriyovych Sereda (born 5 September 1983) is a former Russian and Ukrainian professional football player.

Club career
Sereda played in the Ukrainian Second League with FC Palmira Odesa and FC Metalurh-2 Zaporizhzhia.

External links
 
 

1983 births
Living people
Russian footballers
Ukrainian footballers
Association football defenders
FC Ivan Odesa players
FC Palmira Odesa players
FC Metalurh-2 Zaporizhzhia players
FC Sakhalin Yuzhno-Sakhalinsk players
Ukrainian Second League players